Sikort Chuapo is a populated place situated in Pima County, Arizona, United States. Historically, the location as also been known as Pozo Redondo, which was the Mexican name based on the last name of the individual who opened the well there. It has also been known as Sikorttjuupo which is the O'odham for "round tank". Sikort Chuapo means "round spring" in O'odham, and became the official name as result of a Board on Geographic Names decision in 1941.

References

Populated places in Pima County, Arizona